Victoria is a historic home located at Charlotte, Mecklenburg County, North Carolina.  It was built about 1895, and is a two-story, "T"-shaped, Queen Anne style dwelling. It has a slate roof and features a -story, engaged, tower with a conical roof.  It was moved from the corner of Tryon and Seventh Streets to its present location about 1895.

It was listed on the National Register of Historic Places in 1973.

References

Houses on the National Register of Historic Places in North Carolina
Queen Anne architecture in North Carolina
Houses completed in 1895
Houses in Charlotte, North Carolina
National Register of Historic Places in Mecklenburg County, North Carolina